The Freehold Secondary (also called the Freehold Industrial Track) is a partially active rail line in New Jersey, the active portion of which is owned by Conrail Shared Assets Operations (CSAO) and operated by the Delaware and Raritan River Railroad (DRR), a subsidiary of Chesapeake and Delaware, LLC. The active portion operates between Jamesburg and Freehold. The dormant section between Freehold and the junction with the Southern Secondary in Farmingdale has been dormant since 1989; DRR began track rehabilitation on this section in January 2023.

History

Construction and early history (1851–1879)
The Freehold and Jamesburg Agricultural Railroad was incorporated in 1851 to connect Freehold with the Camden and Amboy Railroad in Jamesburg. The first section between the aforementioned towns was opened to traffic in 1853. In 1868, the line was extended to a connection with the Northeast Corridor (then Camden and Amboy Railroad's main line). On the other end of the line, a firm known as the Squankum and Freehold Marl Company built track from Freehold to Farmingdale in 1868, and leased it to the Freehold and Jamesburg in the same year. The final link in the railroad, between Farmingdale and Sea Girt was built by the Farmingdale and Squan Village Railroad Company which was incorporated on April 3, 1867, and mandated to finish construction of their line by July 1, 1877. Its line was leased to the Freehold and Jamesburg in 1874. Also in 1874, the line between Jamesburg and Monmouth Junction (the connection with the Northeast Corridor) was sold to the Camden and Amboy Railroad.

On May 24, 1879, the three companies were merged to form a new company also called the Freehold and Jamesburg Agricultural Railroad. In the Board of Directors Election held on June 24, 1879, Strickland Kneass was elected president (he had been named president on the merger documents in May, but had not been formally elected by the board until June). Since June 1, 1879, the company's trackage has been operated by the Pennsylvania Railroad.

Pennsylvania Railroad/Penn Central operation (1879–1976)
Operation continued and prospered under the Pennsylvania Railroad, and both freight and passenger trains used the line up until the Pennsylvania cut its Trenton-Jamesburg-Sea Girt train on May 29, 1962. The line famously hosted dying President Garfield, and his private train as it traveled from Washington, DC, to where he died in Elberon, New Jersey. In 1939, the line hosted the King and Queen of the United Kingdom’s private train, en route to Red Bank, New Jersey. After dieselization, the line's passenger trains were a favorite with railfans because of their use of Doodlebugs, a gas electric car. Freight service continued after the end of passenger service, but in 1964, the section between Sea Girt and Farmingdale was torn up, parts of which became the Edgar Felix Bikeway.

Conrail (1976–2022)
In 1976, Conrail took over the operations of seven northeastern railroads, including the Penn Central, who operated the line after the 1968 merger of the Pennsylvania and the New York Central Railroad (the New Haven Railroad was incorporated into the merger in 1969, but its inclusion was of little consequence to this particular line). Unlike other routes that it operated, Conrail did not abandon the remaining portions of the Freehold Secondary, but a 1978 division map marks the section between Freehold and Jamesburg as a "light density line." In the 1999 breakup of Conrail between Norfolk Southern Railway and CSX Transportation, the line went to Conrail Shared Assets (CSAO), a joint switching and terminal railroad created in order to serve the New York, Philadelphia and Detroit markets equally from both carriers. CSAO initially kept the entire line open, but since the early 2000s, there has not been a train east of the Prestone plant in Freehold. CSAO relinquished common carrier operations to the Delaware and Raritan River Railroad effective July 1, 2022. However, CSAO retains trackage rights along the line.

Delaware and Raritan River Railroad (2022-present)
The Delaware and Raritan River Railroad assumed common carrier operations along the Freehold Secondary on July 1, 2022.

Current operations
Conrail Local Freight WPSA-31 (Wayfreight Philadelphia division SAyreville - 31) runs from Browns Yard to Jamesburg to interchange with DRR. From Jamesburg, DRR local JB-01 runs to Freehold to serve the remaining customers on the line:
These include:
S&A Molding, Englishtown, receives wood pellets.
Reed & Perrine, Tennent, receives fertilizer chemicals.
Builders General, Freehold, receives lumber.
Prestone, Freehold, receives plastic pellets and chemicals.

See also
Monmouth Ocean Middlesex Line

References

Pennsylvania Railroad lines
Rail infrastructure in New Jersey